The Saint Petersburg derby was the association football local derby between two Saint Petersburg based teams – Dynamo Saint Petersburg and Zenit.

History
The first derby between Zenit and Dynamo (at that time Zenit were called Stalinets) took place in October 1938 in during USSR Championship. Stalinets (now - Zenit) won with a score 4:3. At all, the Zenit won the derby 17 times, the Dynamo - 11 times. Five matches ended in a draw. In every game, you can see colourful performances of fans of both teams, but especially of Zenit's, because of a small number of Dynamo fans, since the fall of the Soviet Union.

During 2017/2018 season, there was a rivalry between Zenit and FC Tosno, from Leningrad oblast, which called sometimes as North-west Derby. The teams have played against each other twice only, with Zenit winning both games (5:0 in 2010, and 2:0 in 2017). Since 2018/2019 season there is another rivalry with FC Leningradets, but the clubs did not compete yet.

List of matches

Soviet Top League (1936–1992)

Soviet Cup (1947–1990)

Russian Cup (1992–present)

Honours

See also
 List of association football club rivalries in Europe

References

FC Dynamo Saint Petersburg
FC Zenit Saint Petersburg
Football derbies in Russia